Luigi Napoleoni (3 May 1937 – 10 September 2021) was an Italian boxer. He competed in the men's middleweight event at the 1960 Summer Olympics.

References

1937 births
2021 deaths
Italian male boxers
Olympic boxers of Italy
Boxers at the 1960 Summer Olympics
Boxers from Rome
Middleweight boxers
20th-century Italian people